"Games" is a song by American boyband New Kids on the Block, released as the first single from their first compilation/remix album, No More Games/The Remix Album (1990). Employing hip-hop samples with riffs sung by Jordan Knight, and defensive rhymes by Donnie Wahlberg, the song was a dramatic departure from their previously clean cut sound. It also includes shout-outs to Donnie's brother Mark Wahlberg and his group Marky Mark and the Funky Bunch. The song features a chorus section taken from the movie the wizard of Oz, namely the West witch's soldiers chant: oh ee oh, oh oh. The accompanying music video for "Games" received heavy rotation on MTV Europe.

Feeling the name "New Kids on the Block" was too childish for the group, the band shortened their name to "NKOTB" during the time of the single's release. The song received decent airplay from stations nationwide.

Track listings
 12" maxi - Promo
 "Games" (the kids get hard mix) – 5:22
 "What'cha Gonna Do (About It)" (Arthur Baker remix) – 5:51
 "Call It What You Want" (C&C pump it mix) – 5:31
 "My Favorite Girl" (remix) – 5:29

 CD maxi
 "Games (the kids get hard mix extended version) – 5:22
 "Games (album version) – 3:27
 "(You've Got It) The Right Stuff" (New Kids in the house mix) – 5:36
 "Treat Me Right" – 4:17

 7" single
 "Games" (the kids get hard mix 7" mix) – 3:58
 "Games" (the album version) – 3:27

Charts

References

1990 songs
1991 singles
Columbia Records singles
New jack swing songs
New Kids on the Block songs
Song recordings produced by Maurice Starr
Song recordings produced by Robert Clivillés
Songs written by Donnie Wahlberg
Songs written by Maurice Starr